Neil Anthony Cordice (born 7 April 1960) is an English former professional footballer who played in the Football League as a forward.

References

External links
Profile at Neil Brown

1960 births
Living people
People from Amersham
English footballers
Association football forwards
Wycombe Wanderers F.C. players
Northampton Town F.C. players
Wealdstone F.C. players
Yeovil Town F.C. players
Walton & Hersham F.C. players
Flackwell Heath F.C. players
Chesham United F.C. players
English Football League players